Olivier Jacque (born 29 August 1973 in Villerupt, France) is a French former professional Grand Prix motorcycle road racer.

Career
He was second in the 250cc European Championship in 1994, before moving on to the 250cc World Championship. He achieved a top ten finish in the points standings every year he competed. In 2000 he had a season-long battle for the championship with Tech3 teammate Shinya Nakano and Daijiro Kato, ultimately winning the 250cc Motorcycle World Champion on a Yamaha YZR250.

For 2001, he moved up to the 500cc class with the Tech3 team. He spent three years with Tech3, before starting 2004 without a ride. He made one appearance on a Moriwaki bike, but again was without a ride as 2005 started. He stepped in for the injured Alex Hofmann in China and stunned the series regulars by finishing second to Valentino Rossi on the factory Kawasaki. He was then permanently hired by Kawasaki as an occasional extra race rider. He did not race for them in 2006, but was chosen for 2007 alongside countryman Randy de Puniet, replacing Nakano. Sete Gibernau was later revealed to have rejected the ride before Jacque was offered it.

However, the season was a disaster. At Istanbul he triggered a four-bike collision, missing his braking point into a corner on lap 1 and hitting Colin Edwards, with Dani Pedrosa and Chris Vermeulen also getting caught up. In the next round in Shanghai he crashed in practice, gashing his arm severely enough to be unable to race there or at Le Mans. He again crashed in practice at Barcelona, missing this race too.

Following the series of injuries, Jacque announced his retirement from MotoGP in June 2007. He remains as development rider and technical advisor for Kawasaki Racing Team.

Commitment
Olivier Jacque is today a member of the ‘Champions for Peace’ club, a group of 54 famous elite athletes committed to serving peace in the world through sport, created by Peace and Sport, a Monaco-based international organization.

Career statistics

Grand Prix motorcycle racing

Races by year
(key) (Races in bold indicate pole position, races in italics indicate fastest lap)

References

External links 

  Official website

1973 births
Living people
Sportspeople from Meurthe-et-Moselle
French motorcycle racers
Kawasaki Motors Racing MotoGP riders
250cc World Championship riders
500cc World Championship riders
Knights of the Ordre national du Mérite
Tech3 MotoGP riders
MotoGP World Championship riders
250cc World Riders' Champions